A grant-in-aid is money coming from a central government for a specific project. Such funding is usually used when the government and the legislature decide that the recipient should be publicly funded but operate with reasonable independence from the state.

In the United Kingdom, most bodies in receipt of grants-in-aid are non-departmental public bodies.

A grant-in-aid has funds allocated by one level of government to another level of government that are to be used for specific purposes. Such funds are usually accompanied by requirements and standards set by the governing body for how they are to be spent. An example of this would be how the US Congress has required states to raise the drinking age for alcohol from 18 to 21 for the individual states to continue to qualify for federal funds for interstate highways within each state.

References

External links
 Explanation by British government

Government finances
Grants (money)